Cantrell Peak is a peak,  high, standing  north-northeast of Mount Calvin and overlooking Ebbe Glacier from the south, in the northern part of the Everett Range. It was mapped by the United States Geological Survey from surveys and from U.S. Navy aerial photographs, 1960–63, and named by the Advisory Committee on Antarctic Names for Major Robert L. Cantrell, United States Marine Corps, pilot on photographic flights in C-130 aircraft during Operation Deep Freeze 1968 and 1969. The peak lies situated on the Pennell Coast, a portion of Antarctica lying between Cape Williams and Cape Adare.

References 

Mountains of Victoria Land
Pennell Coast